() is a fishing village in Sør-Varanger Municipality in Troms og Finnmark county in northeastern Norway. The village is situated along the Varangerfjorden which is a vast bay off the Barents Sea (a part of the Arctic Ocean), near the border with Russia.

The name
The name Bugøynes means "bay island headland", from bug (bay, inlet) + øy (island) + nes (headland). Bugøya (the island with several inlets) has also given its name to the neighbouring Bugøyfjord.

History
Bugøynes was settled by Norwegians in the 17th century - but later deserted. It was repopulated by people from Finland in the 18th century.

Bugøynes was one of very few places that was not burnt and destroyed under Operation Nordlicht (1944–45).

Before the road was built to Bugøynes in 1962, the main link between Bugøynes and the rest of the world was by sea. The most-visited town in those days was Vadsø, across the Varangerfjorden. Although the town of Kirkenes, on the southern side of the fjord, was the local administrative centre for Bugøynes, it did not become the centre for shopping until people could reach it by car.

Now most trade in this part of Finnmark takes place in Kirkenes. Workplaces in Bugøynes include fishing, salmon and other fish processing, the processing of reindeer meat and game, as well as slipway and machine workshops. The village has one grocery shop, a post-office, a bistro and a doctor's surgery (every other Thursday). There are also a children's nursery, a school, a retirement home, a library branch (not anymore), a dentist (not anymore), and Bugøynes Chapel.

Sights

The Pleym Pier. Restored piers dating back to the 19th century with a museum exhibition showing old coastal culture. Open on request.
The Lassi House, culture house dating back to the 1850s, now used as museum and public library branch.
Ranvika Bird Sanctuary. The largest bird sanctuary in Sør-Varanger is situated about 90 minutes' walk from Bugøynes. The footpath to the sanctuary is well marked.
The Norway King Crab. Bugøynes is a center in Norway for commercial fishing of this delicacy.

References

External links
Bygda som krabbet seg tilbake [The village that crawled itself back]
Bygda som ikke ble brent under krigen - Da offiser Peter Paul Flach og de tyske soldatene forlot Bugøynes i Øst-Finnmark sparte de bygda som en sympatisk handling, sier myten. – Det er nettopp det det er, en myte, sier lokalhistoriker. [The village that was not burnt during the war]

Sør-Varanger
Barents Sea
Populated places of Arctic Norway
Villages in Finnmark
Ethnic enclaves in Norway